The AD Navyplane was designed by the British Admiralty's Air Department as a reconnaissance aircraft for use during World War I.  Performance of the prototype was so disappointing that plans to produce it were cancelled almost immediately.

The Navyplane was designed by the Admiralty's Harold Bolas with the assistance of R.J. Mitchell of Supermarine.  It was a pusher floatplane biplane with the pilot and observer being seated ahead of the wings in a streamlined lightweight nacelle mounted in the gap between the upper and lower sets of wings.  A Smith Static radial engine and a pusher propeller were installed behind them.

Two examples were ordered in 1916 for the Royal Naval Air Service (RNAS).  Serial numbers were allocated for seven Navyplanes (9095-'96, N.1070-'74) but just one prototype (9095) was completed.  Tests of this Supermarine-built prototype commenced in August 1916 (flown by Lieutenant-Commander John Seddon) but proved seriously underpowered and unsatisfactory.  The engine was replaced with an AR.1 rotary engine (which was later redesignated the BR.1 for Bentley Rotary 1) and retested in May 1917.  However, even without a military load and observer, the Navyplane's performance still proved to be poor, and the design was abandoned on 27 August 1917, with no second prototype being produced.

Supermarine attempted to design an improved version to replace the Short 184, the design, the Supermarine Patrol Seaplane, being powered by a 200 hp (149 kW) Sunbeam engine. While contracts for six aircraft were placed, work was abandoned before a prototype was built, the Short 184 proving adequate in the patrol role.

Specifications (AD Navyplane)

See also

References
Notes

Bibliography
Andrews, C. F., and Morgan, E. B. Supermarine Aircraft since 1914. London:Putnam, 1987, .
Bruce, J.M . British Aeroplanes 1914-18. London:Putnam, 1957.
Mason, Francis K. The British Bomber since 1914. London:Putnam, 1994. .

Navyplane
1910s British military reconnaissance aircraft
Single-engined pusher aircraft
Flying boats
Supermarine aircraft
Biplanes
Aircraft first flown in 1916
Rotary-engined aircraft